St Peter's Church is the Church of England parish church of Twineham, a village in the Mid Sussex District of West Sussex, England.  The church, with St Barthomew's in Albourne and Christ Church in Sayers Common, serves the modern ecclesiastical parish of Albourne, Sayers Common and Twineham (ASCaT).

The church is Tudor, probably dating from the early 16th century.  According to local tradition it was built in 1516, early in the reign of Henry VIII and before the English Reformation.  The church is built of brick, consisting of a chancel, nave, south porch, and west tower, with a shingled oak spire.  The church was sympathetically restored in 1894, when an organ-chamber was added on the north side of the chancel.

The church is a Grade I listed building, included on the National Heritage List for England ‘for the rarity of small early C16 churches’ (List Entry Number 1284819, first listed 28 October 1957).

See also
Grade I listed buildings in West Sussex
List of places of worship in Mid Sussex

References

External links

A church near you: St Peter's
Twineham War Memorials, including memorials in the church

Twineham, St Peter's Church
Twineham, St Peter's Church
Twineham, St Peter's Church